The Faculty of Medicine and Health Sciences is one of the constituent faculties of McGill University. It was established in 1829 after the Montreal Medical Institution was incorporated into McGill College as the college's first faculty; it was the first medical faculty to be established in Canada. The Faculty awarded McGill's first degree, and Canada's first medical degree to William Leslie Logie in 1833.

McGill's Faculty of Medicine and Health Sciences is one of the most well-regarded medical schools in the world. Many researchers, physicians, clinicians, and pioneers within their respective fields have graduated from or have been affiliated with the faculty. Its graduates have gone on to found the Johns Hopkins University School of Medicine and the Johns Hopkins Hospital. There have been at least two Nobel Prize laureates who have completed their entire education at McGill University including MD at the McGill University Faculty of Medicine and Health Sciences including Andrew Schally (Nobel Prize in Physiology or Medicine 1977) and David H. Hubel (Nobel Prize in Physiology or Medicine 1981).

History

The Montreal Medical Institution was established in 1823 by four physicians, Andrew Fernando Holmes, John Stephenson, William Caldwell and William Robertson, all of whom had been trained at the University of Edinburgh Medical School, and were involved in the foundation of the Montreal General Hospital. In 1829 it was incorporated into McGill College as the new College's first faculty; it thus became the first Faculty of Medicine in Canada. A highly didactic approach to medical education called the "Edinburgh curriculum", which consisted of two six-month courses of basic science lectures and two years of "walking the wards" at The Montreal General Hospital, was instituted. From 1833 to 1877 the Faculty followed the pattern set by the University of Edinburgh and required graduating students to submit an 'inaugural dissertation' - a database of these is available.

Sir William Dawson, the principal of McGill, was instrumental in garnering resources for the faculty and pioneering contributions from Thomas Roddick, Francis Shepherd, George Ross and Sir William Osler helped to transform the Victorian era medical school into a leader in modern medical education. Osler graduated from the MDCM program at McGill University Faculty of Medicine in 1872, and co-founded the present-day Johns Hopkins School of Medicine in 1893.

In 1905, the Bishop's University Medical Faculty Montreal who established in Montreal in 1871 closed and amalgamated with McGill University to create the new McGill University Faculty of Medicine, where BU graduates such as Maude Abbott, one of the Canada's earliest female medical graduates transferred to work for McGill as the Curator of the McGill Medical Museum.

The McGill University Health Centre was part of a $2.355 billion Redevelopment Project on three sites - the Glen, the Montreal General and Lachine hospitals. A new $1.300 billion MUHC Glen site fully integrated super-hospital complex opened in 2015.

A new satellite campus for McGill Medicine for a French stream MD, CM program was established in 2020 for the Outaouais region with a graduating class size of 24 and total of 96 in the program. The establishment of the program is part of a $32.5-million construction project of the Groupe de médecine familiale universitaire (GMF-U) de Gatineau.

In September 2020, the Faculty of Medicine changed its name to the Faculty of Medicine and Health Sciences to reflect the growth of interprofessionalism and the diversity in the Faculty of Medicine.

Education
The faculty offers a four-year MDCM degree in medicine and surgery. The Faculty of Medicine and Health Sciences also offers joint degree programs with other disciplines including business (M.D.-M.B.A.) and science/engineering (M.D.-Ph.D.). There is also an accelerated program for selected graduates of the Quebec college system (PRE-MED-ADM or MED-P) that combines one year of science curriculum with the four-year M.D., C.M. degrees.

It is closely affiliated with the McGill University Faculty of Dentistry. Students of dentistry receive instruction together with their medical student colleagues for the first 18 months of their professional training.

The faculty includes six schools: the School of Medicine, the Ingram School of Nursing,  the School of Physical and Occupational Therapy, the School of Communication Sciences and Disorders, the School of Population & Global Health and the School of Biomedical Sciences. It also includes several research centres involved in studies on, for example, pain, neuroscience, and aging. Most of the non-clinical parts of the faculty are housed in the McIntyre Medical Sciences Building ("The Beer Can", “McMed”), situated on McGill's downtown campus on the south side of Mount Royal between Avenue des Pins and Avenue Docteur-Penfield.

The McGill University Faculty of Medicine was the first medical school in Canada to institute a joint MD-MBA program in 1997 in collaboration with the Desautels Faculty of Management. This program allowed students to complete both degrees in five years.

Affiliations

McGill University Health Centre
GLEN super hospital
Royal Victoria Hospital 
Montreal Children's Hospital 
Montreal Chest Institute 
Montreal General Hospital
Allan Memorial Institute (contains MGH's outpatient psychiatry)
Montreal Neurological Hospital
Hôpital de Lachine

McGill affiliate hospitals
Lakeshore General Hospital
Jewish General Hospital
St. Mary's Hospital
Douglas Mental Health University Institute
Shriners Hospital for Children
Hôpital de Gatineau - Groupe de médecine de famille universitaire (GMF-U) de Gatineau
Jewish Rehabilitation Hospital (JRH)
Mount Sinai Hospital Montreal

Reputation
McGill's Faculty of Medicine and Health Sciences has a national and international reputation with a list of faculty and alumni, many of whom were pioneers in their respective fields. It is also ranked as the number 1 medical school nationally in Canada by Maclean's for 18 straight years (including the most recent ranking for 2023). McGill's Medical School has also consistently ranked in the top medical schools worldwide and ranked 21st worldwide on a recent QS World University Ranking of top medical schools world-wide. 
Particularly, among McGill University's renowned reputation of Rhodes Scholars, McGill's Faculty of Medicine and Health Sciences has also produced a number of Rhodes Scholars (Cecil James Falconer Parsons, Munroe Bourne, Douglas George Cameron, Alan G. Kendall, Robert Murray Mundle, John Doehu Stubbs, Geoffrey E. Dougherty, Brian James Ward, Lesley Fellows, Anne Andermann, Astrid-Christoffersen-Deb, Aleksandra Leligdowicz, Benjamin Mappin-Kasirer, Alexander Lachapelle),  including one in the recent 2018 cohort.
For medical school students entering in Fall 2020, the mean four-year undergraduate GPA was 3.87 (excluding graduate GPA), and the mean MCAT score was 32.1 (85th-88th percentile).

Admissions to the McGill Faculty of Medicine and Health Sciences M.D., C.M. program are highly competitive with an acceptance rate of 5.7% for the Class of 2026. 

The Department of Anatomy and Physiology at McGill University ranked 3rd globally in the 2017 QS World University Rankings after Oxford University and Cambridge.

Harry Houdini incident 
In October 1926, renowned magician Harry Houdini was giving a lecture on exposed mediums and spiritualists at McGill University and had invited medical students to his dressing room at Montreal's Princess Theatre. J. Gordon Whitehead, a medical student and boxer, had asked Houdini if he could take a sudden punch to the stomach, as had rumoured to be the case; Houdini received several unexpected punches. Feeling ill later that evening and after refusing medical treatment, Houdini was diagnosed with acute appendicitis a couple of days later and died on October 31, 1926. It remains a controversy whether Houdini died as a result of the punches or was simply unaware of a current appendicitis prior, and Whitehead was never charged.

Notable faculty and alumni
 Bernard Nathanson M.D., C.M. 1949 — obstetrician/gynecologist
 Victor Dzau M.D., C.M. 1972 — president of the Institute of Medicine of the National Academy of Sciences, former president and CEO of Duke University Medical Center
 Daniel Borsuk O.Q., B.Sc. 2000, M.D., C.M. 2006, M.B.A. 2006 — performed first face transplant in Canada
 Thomas Chang O.C., M.D., C.M., Ph.D., FRCP(C), FRS(C) —  pioneer in biomedical engineering, “Father of Artificial Cells”
 Robert Thirsk O.C., O.B.C., M.D., C.M., M.S., M.B.A. — Canadian engineer and physician, astronaut, and chancellor emeritus University of Calgary.
 Joannie Rochette M.D., C.M. 2020 — medal-winning Olympic figure skater
 E. Fuller Torrey M.D., C.M. 1963 — psychiatrist and schizophrenia researcher, founder of the Treatment Advocacy Center
 Maurice Brodie M.D., C.M. 1928 — polio researcher, who developed the polio vaccine in 1935
 Jack Wright M.D., C.M. 1928, — internationally top-ranked tennis star, winner of three Canadian Open men's singles titles and four doubles titles
 Mark Cohen M.D., C.M. 1992 — ophthalmologist, laser eye surgeon and co-founder of LASIK MD
 Avi Wallerstein — ophthalmologist, laser eye surgeon and co-founder of LASIK MD
 Charles Scriver M.D., C.M. 1955 — Canadian pediatrician and biochemical geneticist
 Dafydd Williams O.C., O.Ont., M.D., C.M. 1983, M.S., M.B.A. — a Canadian physician, public speaker, CEO, author and multi-mission astronaut.
David R. Boyd M.D., C.M. 1963, — trauma surgeon, and developer of Regional Trauma Emergency Medical Services (EMS).
 Charles R. Drew M.D., C.M. 1933 — father of modern blood-banking; namesake of Charles R. Drew University of Medicine and Science; founding medical director of the Red Cross Blood Bank in the United States
 Richard Goldbloom O.C., O.N.S., M.D., C.M. 1949 — pediatrician, chancellor of Dalhousie University 1986-2004
 Paul Bruce Beeson M.D., C.M. 1933 — professor of medicine, specializing in infectious diseases; discoverer of interleukin-1
 Ian Stevenson M.D., C.M. 1943 — Canadian-born U.S. psychiatrist
 Ken Evoy M.D., C.M. 1979 — Emergency physician, entrepreneur, founder and chairman of the board of SiteSell
 William Wright  M.D., C.M. 1848 — first person of colour to earn a medical degree in North America 
 Laurent Duvernay-Tardif M.D., C.M. 2018 — offensive guard for the NFL's New York Jets
 Phil Gold, B.Sc. 1957, M.Sc. 1961, M.D., C.M. 1961, Ph.D. 1965 — physician, scientist, and professor, discoverer of carcinoembryonic antigen (CEA), the first biomarker for cancer
 Haile Debas M.D., C.M. 1963 — Dean of the UCSF School of Medicine from 1993 to 2003
 Phil Edwards, M.D., C.M. 1936 — "Man of Bronze", Canada's most-decorated Olympian for many years, and expert in tropical diseases
 David Goltzman, B.Sc. 1966, M.D., C.M. 1968 — physician, scientist, and professor
 Noni MacDonald, pediatric infectious diseases expert, former Dean of Dalhousie University Faculty of Medicine 1999-2003 and first woman in Canada to be named Dean of a medical school.
 Vivek Goel, M.D., C.M. 1984 — president and vice-chancellor of the University of Waterloo
 Katherine O'Brien, M.D., C.M. 1988 — infectious disease expert; Director of the World Health Organization's Department of Immunization, Vaccines and Biologicals
 Frederick Lowy, M.D., C.M. 1959 —  former President and Vice-Chancellor of Concordia University
 Andrew Fernando Holmes — first dean and co-founder of McGill College Medical Faculty
 Chi-Ming Chow M.D., C.M. 1990 —  – cardiologist and board member of the Heart and Stroke Foundation
 David Hunter Hubel B.Sc. 1947, M.D., C.M. 1951 — Nobel laureate in Physiology (1981)
 Joanne Liu M.D., C.M. — International President of Médecins Sans Frontières (Doctors Without Borders)
 Colin MacLeod M.D., C.M. 1932 — Canadian-American geneticist, identified DNA as hereditary material in the body, Avery–MacLeod–McCarty experiment
 John Lancelot Todd B.A. 1898, M.D., C.M. 1900 — parasitologist
 Claude Roy — one of the founding fathers of the field of paediatric gastroenterology
 Ronald Melzack Ph.D. 1954 — developed the McGill Pain Questionnaire
 Jack Wennberg  M.D., C.M. 1961 — pioneer in public health of medicine and founder of The Dartmouth Institute for Health Policy and Clinical Practice
 Brenda Milner Ph.D. 1952 — neuropsychologist, "founder of neuropsychology"
 Eric Berne BSc 1931, M.D., C.M. 1935 —  psychiatrist who created the theory of transactional analysis 
 William Reginald Morse M.D., C.M. 1902 —  one four founders of the West China Union University in Chengdu, Sichuan, in 1914; went on to become dean of the medical faculty
 Robert Murray - B.A., M.A., M.D., C.M. 1943 - Bacteriologist 
 Clarke Fraser Ph.D. 1945, M.D., C.M. 1950 — pioneer in medical genetics
 Perry Rosenthal M.D., C.M. 1958 — professor of ophthalmology at Harvard Medical School and developer of the first gas-permeable scleral contact lens
 William Feindel M.D., C.M. 1945 — neurosurgeon and neuroscientist
 Francis Alexander Caron Scrimger M.D., C.M. 1905 — Lieutenant Colonel in the Canadian Army recipient of the Victoria Cross
 Cara Tannenbaum M.D., C.M. 1994 — geriatric medicine physician and researcher 
 T. Wesley Mills M.D., C.M. 1878 —  physician, Canada's first professional physiologist
 Mark Wainberg O.C., O.Q., B.Sc. 1966 — HIV/AIDS researcher, discoverer of lamivudine, Director of the McGill University AIDS Centre, 
 Santa J. Ono Ph.D. 1991 — immunologist and eye researcher, President & Vice-Chancellor University of British Columbia
 William Osler M.D., C.M. 1872 —  professor, medical pioneer, developed bedside teaching, one of the four founders of the Johns Hopkins School of Medicine
 Betty Price M.D., C.M. 1980 — anesthesiologist and American politician/member of the Georgia House of Representatives
 Edward Llewellyn-Thomas M.D., C.M. 1955 — English scientist, university professor and science fiction author
 Rocke Robertson B.Sc. 1932, M.D., C.M. 1936 — physician
 William Henry Drummond — Irish-born Canadian poet, physician
 Albert Ernest Forsythe M.D., C.M. 1930 — physician and pioneer aviator
 Harold Griffith M.D., C.M. 1922 — anaesthesiologist, pioneered the use of curare as a muscle relaxant, formed and was first President of World Federation of Societies of Anaesthesiologists
 Alice Benjamin Res. OB/GYN 1978 — maternal-fetal medicine specialist and pioneer in the field; performed Canada's first successful diabetic renal transplant and pregnancy
 James Horace King M.D., C.M. 1895 — physician, Canadian senator, and governor and one of the leaders of the establishment of the American College of Surgeons
 Arnold Aberman O.C. B.Sc. 1965, M.D., C.M. 1967 — Dean of University of Toronto Faculty of Medicine 1992–1999, and instrumental founder/consulting dean of Northern Ontario School of Medicine
 Victor Goldbloom O.Q., O.C., M.D., C.M. 1945 — pediatrician, politician
 Franklin White M.D., C.M. 1969 — public health scientist
 Martin Henry Dawson M.D., C.M. 1923 — infectious disease researcher, first person in history to inject penicillin into a patient, 1940
 Walter Mackenzie — Canadian surgeon and academic, Dean of University of Alberta Faculty of Medicine 1959-1974
 John Thomas Finnie M.D., C.M. 1869 — physician and Quebec politician
 Philip Seeman M.D., C.M. 1960 — Canadian schizophrenia researcher and neuropharmacologist, known for his research on dopamine receptors
 Munroe Bourne M.D., C.M. 1940 — physician, Olympic medal-winning swimmer, Rhodes Scholar, Major in the Canadian Army
 George Genereux M.D., C.M. 1960 — diagnostic radiologist and Olympic gold medalist and inductee in the Canadian Sports Hall of Fame
 James John Edmund Guerin M.D., C.M. 1878 — politician, Mayor of Montreal
 Peter Macklem O.C., M.D., C.M. 1956 — cardio-pulmonary physician and researcher, founding director of the Meakins-Christie Laboratories  
 Richard Margolese O.C., M.D., C.M. — surgeon, researcher and pioneer in treatment of breast cancers
 Cluny Macpherson M.D., C.M. 1901 — physician and inventor of the British Smoke Hood (an early gas mask)
 Thomas George Roddick M.D., C.M. 1868 —  surgeon, politician and founder of the Medical Council of Canada
 Andrew Schally Ph.D. 1957 — Nobel laureate in Physiology (1977)
 Vincenzo Di Nicola BA, 1976; Res. Psychiatry 1986 —  Italian-Canadian psychologist, psychiatrist and family therapist, and philosopher of mind
 Maurice LeClair M.D., C.M. 1951 —  Canadian physician, businessman, civil servant, and academic; Dean of the Faculty of Medicine at the Université de Sherbrooke
 John Stephenson — co-founder of McGill College Medical Faculty
 Arthur Vineberg B.Sc. 1924, M.D., C.M. 1928, Ph.D. 1933 — cardiac surgeon, pioneer of revascularization
 Antoine Hakim — Canadian engineer and physician, former CEO of the Canadian Stroke Network
 Sir Charles-Eugène-Napoléon Boucher de Boucherville M.D., C.M. 1843, Physician, politician, two-time Premier of Quebec
 R. Tait McKenzie M.D., C.M. 1892 — pioneer of modern physiotherapy
 David Saint-Jacques Res. FM 2007 — astronaut with the Canadian Space Agency (CSA), astrophysicist, engineer, and a physician
 C. Miller Fisher described lacunar strokes and identified transient ischemic attacks as stroke precursors
 Marla Shapiro M.D., C.M. 1979 — primary medical consultant for CTV News
 Meyer Balter M.D., C.M. 1981 — pulmonologist, medical researcher, and professor, University of Toronto
 Edward William Archibald M.D., C.M. 1896 Canada's first neurosurgeon, thoracic surgical pioneer
 Casey Albert Wood ophthalmologist and comparative zoologist
 Maude Abbott M.D., C.M. 1894 — of Canada's earliest female medical graduates, international expert on congenital heart disease, namesake of Maude Abbott Medical Museum

Current and past faculty members 
 Madhukar Pai — expert on global health and epidemiology, specifically tuberculosis
 Nahum Sonenberg — Israeli-Canadian expert virologist, microbiologist, and biochemist, discoverer of mRNA 5' cap-binding protein
 Jonathan Meakins B.Sc. 1962 — surgeon, immunologist
 Heinz Lehmann Canadian psychiatrist, expert in treatment of schizophrenia the "father of modern psychopharmacology."
 Maurice McGregor South-African cardiologist
 David S Rosenblatt, M.D., C.M. 1970 — prominent medical geneticist, pediatrician; expert in the field of inborn errors of folate and vitamin B12 metabolism
 Michael Meaney — researcher and expert in biological psychiatry, neurology, and neurosurgery
 Terence Coderre — researcher, pain expert, Harold Griffith Chair in Anaesthesia Research
 Judes Poirier — researcher, professor of Medicine and Psychiatry, director of the Molecular Neurobiology Unit at the Douglas Institute Research Centre
 Wilder Penfield — neurosurgery pioneer, first director of the Montreal Neurological Institute and Montreal Neurological Hospital
 David Goltzman, B.Sc. 1966, M.D., C.M. 1968 — physician, scientist, and professor
 George Karpati, nenowned Canadian neurologist and neuroscientist 
 Charles Philippe Leblond — pioneer of cell biology and stem cell research 
 Bernard Belleau —  Canadian molecular pharmacologist best known for his role in the discovery of HIV drug Lamivudine
 Henry Friesen —  Canadian endocrinologist, discoverer of human prolactin
 Hans Selye — Hungarian-Canadian endocrinologist
 James C. Hogg —  expert in  Chronic Obstructive Pulmonary Disease
 Jonathan Campbell Meakins — Physician and Dean of the Faculty of Medicine 1941–1948, first President and Founder of the Royal College of Physicians and Surgeons of Canada
 Albert Aguayo —  Canadian neurologist and assistant professor in the department of Neurology and Neurosurgery, former President International Brain Research Organization
 John J. R. Macleod — co-discoverer of insulin, Nobel Prize in Physiology or Medicine (1923) laureate
 Rémi Quirion — first Chief Scientist of Quebec
 Lydia Giberson — Canadian-born psychiatrist and pioneering Metropolitan Life Insurance Company executive
 Marvin Kwitko —  Canadian ophthalmologist who pioneered in cataract surgery and laser eye surgery
 Donald Ewen Cameron — Scottish-born psychiatrist known for his involvement in Project MKUltra
 Joseph B. Martin — Dean of the Harvard Medical School, former chair of neurology and neurosurgery
 Barbara E. Jones — Canadian neuroscientist, professor emerita in the McGill University Department of Neurology and Neurosurgery
 Gustavo Turecki — Canadian psychiatrist, suicidologist, neuroscientist
 Juda Hirsch Quastel — pioneer in neurochemistry and soil metabolism; Director of the McGill University-Montreal General Hospital Research Institute
 John Dossetor —  Canadian physician and bioethicist who is notable for co–coordinating the first kidney transplant in Canada and the Commonwealth
 Ouida Ramón-Moliner —  Canadian anaesthetist 
 Shyamala Gopalan — breast cancer researcher in the Faculty of Medicine and McGill-affiliated Lady Davis Institute for Medical Research; mother of U.S. Vice President Kamala Harris

See also
Osler Library of the History of Medicine
McIntyre Medical Sciences Building
McGill University Health Centre
McGill University
McGill University Life Sciences Research Complex

References

Further reading
Joseph Hanaway and Richard Cruess. "McGill Medicine, Volume 1, 1829-1885. The First Half Century".
Joseph Hanaway, Richard Cruess, and James Darragh. "McGill Medicine, Volume II, 1885-1936".

External links
Medical Library Archives Collection, Osler Library Archives, McGill University. Collection of primary sources documenting the growth of the Medical Library at McGill University. Also includes announcements, university calendars, and directories related to the Faculty of Medicine

McGill University
Medical schools in Canada